Blues Brothers: Private is a book published in 1980, designed to help flesh out the universe in which The Blues Brothers (the first film) took place. Private was written and designed by John Belushi's wife, Judith Jacklin, and Tino Insana, a friend of John's from their days at The Second City.

The book consists of paperwork and clippings collected by Sister Mary Stigmata (the character played by Kathleen Freeman in the film) and stored in her personal files. The factoids provided in Private refer to fictitious events and fictionalized versions of real-life people (namely, the other band members). However, many real life and childhood photos of the actors and band members are used to illustrate the documents. The following are some of the revelations the book makes within this continuity:
 Jake Blues was born Jacob Papageorge, son of Artesia Papageorge, a woman in prison for murdering her husband, who dies giving birth and insisting he be named "Jake."
 As a baby, Elwood Blues was abandoned at a newspaper stand. He was initially named after Mike Delaney, the investigating patrolman, so his birth name is Elwood Delaney.
 Carrie Fisher's character in the movie is named Camille Ztdetelik.
 Steve Cropper was raised Amish, but left the Amish country to become a musician. In the original script and the novelization, Cropper was raised in a Hutterite colony in Indiana.
 Alan Rubin "looks Italian, acts Italian, but is Jewish".

All copies of the book came with a detachable poster that was a replica of the posters used to promote the band's gig at the Palace Hotel Ballroom in the film The Blues Brothers.

The Blues Brothers
1980 American novels
Novels based on films